Tino Bianchi (21 June 1905 – 4 January 1996) was an Italian actor. He performed in more than fifty films between 1933 and 1995.

Filmography

External links 
 

1905 births
1996 deaths
Italian male film actors
People from São Paulo
20th-century Italian male actors
Brazilian emigrants to Italy